John Armstrong Taylor Meadows (1817-1875) was a British interpreter in China, and the younger brother of Thomas Taylor Meadows. Working at Ningpo, he met Robert Hart. Disenchanted with government service, he became a merchant. He had several children by his Chinese partner, and died in Tianjin.

References

Interpreters
19th-century British people
19th-century Chinese people
1817 births
1875 deaths